Jamini Roy College, established in 1986, is the general degree rural college in Beliatore, Bankura district. The college is thus named because Jamini Roy, a pioneer of modern art in India, was born in Beliatore. It offers undergraduate courses in arts. It is affiliated to  Bankura University. Till the academic year 2016-17 it was affiliated to Burdwan University.

Departments

Arts
Honours & General Courses
Bengali
English
History
Sanskrit
Geography
Pass/General Courses
Economics
Political Science
Philosophy
Education
Co-Curricular Activities
NCC
NSS
From the academic year 2017-18 the college has switched over to the semester system.

Accreditation
The college is recognized by the University Grants Commission (UGC). Jamini Roy College has been awarded "B" by NAAC in 2016.

See also

References

External links 
Jamini Roy College

Colleges affiliated to Bankura University
Educational institutions established in 1986
Universities and colleges in Bankura district
1986 establishments in West Bengal